Ohio Village is a living history museum in Columbus, Ohio, United States. It is operated by the non-profit Ohio History Connection.

The village, intended to provide a firsthand view of life in Ohio during the American Civil War, opened July 27, 1974, on  adjacent to the Ohio History Center in north Columbus. Currently, the Ohio Village is themed toward life in the 1890s. The buildings that make up the village are all reproductions and currently include: John Hauck Foundation Welcome Center, Ohio Village Schoolhouse, Town Hall, The Telegraphic Advertiser, P. Wylie's Emporium, Mason Lodge, Ohio Muffins Field, American House Hotel and Tavern, Schmidt House, Church, Pavilion, H&P Women's Study Club, Ohio Bank, McKeen's Ready Made Clothing, J Holbrook Photographer, Pharmacy, Blacksmith, Barn, Taylor House, Barrymore Funeral Parlor, Spinner & Co Toy Shop, Barber Shop, Barrington Bicycles, Murphy's Lodging House, and the Burton House.

The Ohio Village is open to visitors Memorial Day weekend through Labor Day weekend starting in 2012. Visitors enter through the Ohio History Center museum and can enjoy the Village as part of their visit.

One of the most popular of the village's annual signature events is the All Hallow's Eve, an 1860s-style celebration of Halloween that has taken place in late October every year since 1985. The festivities include fortunetelling, costumed interpretation of beliefs and superstitions related to the season, and a parade for the dead through the town center meant to appease roaming spirits. The night culminates in a production of Washington Irving's Legend of Sleepy Hollow.

Visitors can also experience Dickens of a Christmas every December. This event features live carolers; horse-drawn carriage rides; a Victorian Santa Clause; and Dickens' own Scrooge, Marley, and the Ghosts of Christmas. 

Ohio Village is also home to two historic baseball teams, the Ohio Village Muffins and Lady Diamonds. Both teams play by the 19th-century rules of the game, very similar to those followed by the New York Knickerbockers, an early baseball club, in 1845. The Ohio Cup Vintage Baseball Festival, held at the village every year in the late summer, draws teams from across the country to compete in a tournament played by the old rules.

References

External links

 
 Information about Ohio Village
 Information regarding the Ohio Village Muffins
 Official website of the Ohio Village Muffins

History museums in Ohio
Museums in Columbus, Ohio
Ohio History Connection
Living museums in Ohio
Museums established in 1974
Masonic museums in the United States
University District (Columbus, Ohio)